Hildegard Korger (18 June 1935 in Reichenberg, Czechoslovakia  – 8 November 2018 ) was a master calligrapher, scholar and professor at the Hochschule für Grafik und Buchkunst Leipzig.

She is author of the Handbook of Type and Lettering (Schrift und Schreiben) which is considered by many to be one of the most definitive and complete books ever written on the subject of type and lettering arts. It is dedicated to her former teacher, the Leipzig typographer Albert Kapr (1918–1995). She was a member of Association Typographique Internationale.

References 

German calligraphers
German typographers and type designers
1935 births
2018 deaths
Women calligraphers
Women graphic designers
Academic staff of the Hochschule für Grafik und Buchkunst Leipzig
Writers from Liberec
Sudeten German people